Fred Doucette is an American politician. He serves as a Republican member of the New Hampshire House of Representatives, representing Rockingham County District 8, the town of Salem, New Hampshire. In 2020, Doucette was appointed a deputy Republican leader.

References

Year of birth missing (living people)
Living people
Republican Party members of the New Hampshire House of Representatives
21st-century American politicians